Adam Peter Rickitt (born 29 May 1978) is an English actor, singer and model. He portrayed the role of Nick Tilsley in the ITV soap opera Coronation Street from 1997 to 1999, and again from 2002 to 2004. He later joined the pop group 5th Story, set up for The Big Reunion, before joining the Channel 4 soap Hollyoaks from 2017 to 2020.

Early life
Rickitt was born in Crewe, the youngest of four brothers. His father is co-owner of an estate agency. Rickitt was educated at Sedbergh School, a boarding school in Cumbria.

Rickitt has spoken publicly about suffering from bulimia in his teenage years and about how male sufferers have largely been neglected.

Career

Modelling
Prior to his acting career, Rickitt was briefly a child model. He subsequently modelled for magazines including Attitude and Cosmopolitan.

Acting
Rickitt rose to fame on the ITV soap opera Coronation Street, where he took over the role of Nick Tilsley in 1997. The part had been played by Warren Jackson until 1996, when the character moved to Canada.

Rickitt left the series in 1999, returning briefly in 2002 and for a longer spell from 2003 to 2004. His most famous and controversial storyline was in 2003, when his character was involved in the series' first gay kiss with Todd Grimshaw (played by Bruno Langley).

In March 2006, Rickitt took part in the Channel 4 reality series The Games. He took part as a replacement, after the scheduled contestant, Goldie, had to pull out, following an accident. Rickitt himself sustained two black eyes after over-rotating off the diving board. He finished last in the contest.

Rickitt joined the cast of the New Zealand soap opera Shortland Street in early 2007, portraying the role of Kieran Mitchell, with his first appearance being shown on 16 March 2007. The character was written out of the series in 2010, with Rickitt's final episode broadcast on 2 August 2010. He had said that he preferred his role on Shortland Street to working on Coronation Street.

Rickitt later returned to the United Kingdom. Where he acted in the Channel 4 soap opera Hollyoaks, playing regular character Kyle Kelly. He left Hollyoaks in June 2020 when his character took his own life.

Music career
Rickitt left Coronation Street in 1999 to start a music career. He signed a six-album deal with Polydor, although he only released one album - Good Times - in 1999. Rickitt's first single, "I Breathe Again", reached number five in the UK and was certified Silver by BPI. The album peaked at number 41 on the UK Albums Chart. Rickitt was then dropped by his record label. In 1999, at a performance at The Prince's Trust Party in the Park, a member of the audience sprayed gas onto the stage when Rickitt was performing. Rickitt fainted after inhaling the substance and was taken to hospital.

In 2010 Rickitt made an appearance at London's G-A-Y club and announced that he was working on a new album. The first single from it, "Tonight", failed to chart and the album wasn't released.

In 2014, he became part of the supergroup 5th Story, who took part in the second series of The Big Reunion along with Kenzie from Blazin' Squad, Dane Bowers from Another Level, Kavana and Gareth Gates.

Stage work
Rickitt starred as Mark Cohen in the 2001 UK tour of Rent, before moving to London's West End. He made a return to the London stage to star in Bill Kenwright's production of Office Games, followed by a new play, Final Judgement, and also appeared in Nick Moran's play Telstar on UK tour in 2005. In December 2006, Rickitt appeared in his first pantomime, Cinderella, in the role of Prince Charming at the Norwich Theatre Royal.

Political aspirations
In October 2005, Rickitt was approved as a prospective parliamentary candidate for the Conservative Party. In February 2006 he appeared on the political debate show Question Time, as the non-partisan guest. In May 2006, he was one of 100 would-be MPs chosen for the Conservative party A-list. The following month, he appeared on Sunday AM with Andrew Marr. He attended national and local Conservative party functions in the hope of being selected as a candidate. however, a newspaper article alleged that he was not a member of the Conservative Party and had only decided to support them because of his dislike of then Prime Minister Tony Blair. Rickitt refuted these claims and confirmed that he was a member, while the newspaper retracted its claims the following week. Along with David Cameron, he also provoked the anger of Sir Nicholas Winterton when it was revealed that Rickitt was being tipped to stand for the safe Conservative seat of Macclesfield, which the outraged Winterton had represented for over thirty years. Winterton responded that he had no intention of standing down from this seat: "I wish Adam luck, but there are no vacancies here."

Rickitt has been unsuccessful in progressing his political career. According to his website, in July 2007 he decided to continue his acting career in New Zealand, rather than seek selection as a candidate, although politics remains a long-term goal.

He returned to the political scene in October 2010 as a guest reporter for the ITV breakfast television programme Daybreak covering the Conservative Party Conference from Birmingham, and hosted a conference gay party.

Personal life
He married Good Morning Britain presenter Katy Fawcett in 2014. In 2019 the couple took over an artisan bottle shop called Dexter & Jones in the Cheshire town of Knutsford.  In August 2021, Katy joined the team at Calendar - the ITV regional news programme for Yorkshire and Lincolnshire.

Charity work
Rickitt works for the Royal Society for the Prevention of Cruelty to Animals as a capital appeals manager.

He left in 2013 to begin working with the cancer charity Help Harry Help Others, and Chief Executive of the mental health foundation, the Caerus Partnership.

Shoplifting incident
On 21 September 2007, Rickitt was arrested and charged with shoplifting a block of cheese, a bottle of HP sauce and a jar of coffee beans from an Auckland supermarket. During an interview with Herald on Sunday he claimed that it was an honest mistake though later claimed that he was drunk at the time of the incident.

Drink driving ban
In August 2020 Rickitt drove 600m whilst under the influence of alcohol to pick up a takeaway.

Filmography

Discography

Albums

Singles

References

External links

 
 Official website

1978 births
Living people
English male models
English male soap opera actors
English pop singers
Musicians from Cheshire
Male actors from Cheshire
People from Crewe
People educated at Sedbergh School
English male stage actors
Conservative Party (UK) people
21st-century English male actors
21st-century English male singers
21st-century English singers
5th Story members